Richland Township is a civil township of Missaukee County in the U.S. state of Michigan. The population was 1,491 at the 2010 census.

Communities 
It was founded in 1878 by William Taylor. A number of Dutch settlers, including Harm Lucas and his five sons, arrived in 1882. A post office was established on February 23, 1883, named Lucas after Harm Lucas, with Abraham Lucas as the first postmaster. The office closed on February 16, 1885 and re-opened on September 7, 1886, with Peter Van den Bosch as postmaster. The office was discontinued on June 30, 1957, and became a rural branch/station of McBain until 1972. 
 Garfield was a rural post office in the township. The post office opened on July 12, 1880, with farmer William N. Taylor as the first postmaster and operated until June 15, 1882. 
 The city of McBain is to the east (and incorporates a small portion of land in Richland Township). The McBain post office with ZIP code 49657 also serves most of Richland Township.
 The city of Cadillac is to the northwest in Wexford County and the Cadillac post office with ZIP code 49601 also serves small areas in northwest Richland Township.

Geography

Highways
 touches the northwest corner of the township.
 forms the eastern boundary of the township north of the city of McBain.

Demographics
As of the census of 2000, there were 1,445 people, 486 households, and 393 families residing in the township. There were 558 housing units at an average density of 15.7 per square mile (6.1/km). The racial makeup of the township was 98.69% White, 0.14% Native American, 0.35% Asian, 0.21% from other races, and 0.62% from two or more races. Hispanic or Latino of any race were 0.48% of the population.

There were 486 households, out of which 45.7% had children under the age of 18 living with them, 73.7% were married couples living together, 4.5% had a female householder with no husband present, and 19.1% were non-families. 15.6% of all households were made up of individuals, and 4.7% had someone living alone who was 65 years of age or older.  The average household size was 2.97 and the average family size was 3.34.

In the township the population was spread out, with 32.9% under the age of 18, 8.0% from 18 to 24, 30.6% from 25 to 44, 19.0% from 45 to 64, and 9.6% who were 65 years of age or older.  The median age was 33 years. For every 100 females, there were 103.2 males.  For every 100 females age 18 and over, there were 101.2 males.

The median income for a household in the township was $45,833, and the median income for a family was $48,947. Males had a median income of $35,250 versus $20,956 for females. The per capita income for the township was $15,834.  About 4.3% of families and 4.6% of the population were below the poverty line, including 7.2% of those under age 18 and 5.7% of those age 65 or over.

References

Townships in Missaukee County, Michigan
Townships in Michigan